Jason Morgan (born October 9, 1976) is a Canadian professional ice hockey coach and former player.

Playing career
Morgan was drafted by the Los Angeles Kings in the fifth round, 118th overall, in the 1995 NHL Entry Draft. While he spent most of his career in the minors, he played in a total of 44 games for five different NHL teams, including the Los Angeles Kings, Calgary Flames, Nashville Predators, Chicago Blackhawks and Minnesota Wild.

Morgan signed with Swedish Elitserien team Södertälje SK in 2008. In 2009, he returned to America with the Springfield Falcons, but after four games he departed and moved to Austria, signing for EC KAC, based in Klagenfurt. Morgan then spent the 2010-11 season in Norway with Stjernen.

After a stint with ECHL's Stockton Thunder in 2011–12, he signed as a free agent to a one-year contract with the Arizona Sundogs of the CHL on September 7, 2012. He spent two years with the Sundogs and retired at the end of the 2013-14 season.

Over the course of his pro career, Morgan played in 584 AHL games and saw the ice in 121 CHL as well as in 120 ECHL contests.

Coaching career
Following his playing career, Morgan took over coaching duties in Hungary, serving as head coach of the youth teams of Miskolc/Debreceni HK. In January 2016, he was named head coach of DVTK Jegesmedvék, a member of the MOL Liga and guided the team to the title.  More recently, he is head coach of the Aalborg Pirates in the top Danish professional league, Metal Ligaen.

Career statistics

References

External links

1976 births
Living people
Arizona Sundogs players
Calgary Flames players
Canadian ice hockey coaches
Canadian ice hockey centres
Chicago Blackhawks players
Cincinnati Cyclones (IHL) players
Florida Everblades players
Hamilton Bulldogs (AHL) players
Hershey Bears players
Houston Aeros (1994–2013) players
Ice hockey people from Newfoundland and Labrador
Kingston Frontenacs players
Kitchener Rangers players
EC KAC players
Long Beach Ice Dogs (IHL) players
Los Angeles Kings draft picks
Los Angeles Kings players
Lowell Lock Monsters players
Minnesota Wild players
Mississippi Sea Wolves players
Nashville Predators players
Norfolk Admirals players
Phoenix Roadrunners (IHL) players
Saint John Flames players
Södertälje SK players
Sportspeople from St. John's, Newfoundland and Labrador
Springfield Falcons players
Stockton Thunder players
Canadian expatriate ice hockey players in Austria
Canadian expatriate ice hockey players in Sweden